Muhammad Aqa-Kermani, also written Aqkirmani, was an 18th-century  Persian physician from Kerman, Iran.

Little is known of Muhammad Aqkirmani's life except that he was active around the year 1747.

He is known by an encyclopedia that is preserved today, as well as three other treatises, all of a lexigraphical or encyclopedic nature.

For his compositions, other than the medical one mentioned above, see:

 Carl Brockelmann, Geschichte der arabischen Litteratur, 1st edition, 2 vols. (Leiden: Brill, 1889–1936). Second edition, 2 vols. (Leiden: Brill, 1943–49). Page references will be to those of the first edition, with the 2nd edition page numbers given in parentheses. vol. 2, p. 454 (604).
 Carl Brockelmann, Geschichte der arabischen Litteratur, Supplement, 3 vols. (Leiden: Brill, 1937–1942). vol. 2, p. 674 no. 7.

Sources

See also
List of Iranian scientists

18th-century Iranian physicians
18th-century births
18th-century deaths